Raftaar (speed in Hindi) may refer to:
 Raftaar (rapper)
 Raftaar (1975 film)
 Raftaar - An Obsession, a 2009 film starring Alok Nath